The Snowman is a wordless children's picture book by British author Raymond Briggs, first published in 1978 by Hamish Hamilton in the United Kingdom, and published by Random House in the United States in November of the same year. The book won a number of awards and was adapted into an animated television film in 1982 which is an annual fixture at Christmas.

The book is entirely wordless, and illustrated with only coloured pencils. Briggs said that it was partly inspired by his previous book Fungus the Bogeyman: "For two years I worked on Fungus, buried amongst muck, slime and words, so... I wanted to do something which was clean, pleasant, fresh and wordless and quick."

Plot
One snowy winter's day, a boy builds a snowman who comes to life at the stroke of midnight. He and the boy play with appliances, toys and other bric-a-brac in the house, all while keeping quiet enough not to wake his parents.

After they play with the lights on the family car, he prepares a feast that the duo eat by candlelight. The snowman takes the boy outside and they begin to fly over the South Downs and watch the sun coming up from Brighton pier before returning home. When the boy wakes in the morning, he finds that the snowman has melted.

In a 2012 interview for the Radio Times, Briggs noted "I don't have happy endings. I create what seems natural and inevitable. The snowman melts, my parents died, animals die, flowers die. Everything does. There's nothing particularly gloomy about it. It's a fact of life." He disputed the idea that the book is a Christmas book, noting that it was only the animated adaptation that introduces this element.

Awards
In the United Kingdom, it was the runner-up for the Kate Greenaway Medal from the Library Association, recognising the year's best children's book illustration by a British writer. In the United States, it was named to the Lewis Carroll Shelf Award list in 1979.

Adaptations

The book was adapted into a half-hour animated television film in 1982, which debuted on Channel 4 in the United Kingdom on 26 December. The Snowman film was nominated for an Academy Award for Best Animated Short Film and has become an annual festive event, inspiring multiple spin-offs including a concert work, stage show, video game and an animated sequel.

Notes

References

External links
 Official Snowman Website
  —immediately, first US edition 

1978 children's books
British picture books
Christmas children's books
Hamish Hamilton books
Novels by Raymond Briggs
Picture books by Raymond Briggs
Pantomime comics
British children's books
Fictional snowmen
Books adapted into plays
Novels adapted into video games